Cramer Tunnel is a disused railroad tunnel near Cramer, Minnesota. It is the longest railway tunnel in Minnesota.

History 
Cramer Tunnel opened in 1957 after LTV Steel blasted a tunnel to connect Hoyt Lakes taconite plant and the location of its ore dock at Taconite Harbor on Lake Superior, from which the taconite was shipped to eastern steel mills. The tunnel was used consistently from its opening to 2001, when LTV Steel went bankrupt and closed their ore dock in Taconite Harbor. When the location was bought by Cleveland Cliffs in 2002, cleanup trains ran on the line to pick up leftover chips and pellets until 2008.

References 

Railway tunnels in the United States
Tunnels in Minnesota
Transportation in Lake County, Minnesota
1957 establishments in Minnesota
Disused tunnels